Cajnarje is a village in the hills northeast of Cerknica in the Inner Carniola region of Slovenia.

Church

The local church, built on a small hill north of the settlement, is dedicated to Saint George and belongs to the Parish of Sveti Vid.

References

External links

Cajnarje on Geopedia

Populated places in the Municipality of Cerknica